Henry Foss High School is an American high school in Tacoma, Washington. Named after civic leader and tugboat tycoon Henry Foss, the school first opened in 1973. Foss was the first high school in Washington state to offer the International Baccalaureate (IB) program. It now has the longest-running IB Diploma Program west of the Mississippi in the USA. It is currently a part of the Tacoma Public Schools.

History
In 1982, Foss became the first high school in Washington state to introduce the International Baccalaureate Diploma Program (DP).

In the spring of 2001, the school was selected by the Bill & Melinda Gates Foundation as an Achiever High School in Washington State.  The school received a $9 million grant to restructure college preparation efforts, as well as an additional $100 million in scholarships. Among the efforts funded by these grants was a restructuring of the school into smaller "academies", a move unpopular with some faculty and students. In April 2004, a group of Foss sophomores threatened to boycott Washington Assessment of Student Learning (WASL) standardized tests if the school board did not promise to retain pre-IB honors courses in English and history.  The principal and school board promised to offer these honor classes in the academies, and the boycott was called off. However, the school ultimately removed the pre-IB classes and replaced them with Honors courses.

In March 2006,  the faculty voted by a 60-40 margin not to apply for a renewal of the Gates Foundation grant; those opposed argued that the grant "destroyed good programs" in the school, including the IB Program and the "team teaching" structure. Shortly after, Tacoma Schools Superintendent Jim Shoemaker directed the school's principal to override this decision and apply for a grant extension.

On January 3, 2007, 17-year-old student Samnang Kok was shot in the school's hallway as classes were about to resume after Winter break. The 18-year-old student Douglas Chanthabouly was convicted of Kok's murder and was sentenced to 23 years in prison.

Foss now offers the IB Middle Years Program (MYP) for 9th and 10th grade students and IB Career-Related Program (CP) for 11th and 12th students interested in more vocational options along with the school's college-preparatory IB Diploma Programme courses.

Traditions

Foss Family Picnic
At the end of the school year, before seniors graduate, ASB organizes the Foss Family Picnic. This day represents the last day that seniors will be on campus. The morning begins with a "seniors only" breakfast, slide show, graduation practice, and last walk through the school. The culminating event is the Foss Family Picnic, where there is a 3:3 basketball tournament, cake walk (musical chairs to earn free dessert), ping pong tournament, game room, and a staff versus student softball game.

Daffodil Festival
Each year, Henry Foss High School participates in the Pierce County Daffodil Festival, a regional tradition since 1933. Each year a competition is held in the fall within the school, for the title of Henry Foss Daffodil Princess. Once selected, the Henry Foss Princess joins other area school representatives in competition for the title of Daffodil Festival Queen. A prestigious regional award, Henry Foss princesses often return to the parade as area celebrity alumni. At Henry Foss High School, every princess is professionally photographed, and her portrait is displayed alongside every other Henry Foss Princess in the school hallway.

Air Force Junior Reserve Officer Training Corps (AFJROTC)
Henry Foss High School is host to an AFJROTC program. It develops leadership, self-discipline, citizenship, and patriotism within students. AFJROTC supports Veterans' Day events throughout the community, participates in drill competitions, supports students taking the ASVAB, and much more. Students are encouraged to apply for the AFJROTC pilot scholarship where students have the opportunity to earn their pilots license - fully funded by the Air Force.

Notable alumni
 Lia Bardeen, 1997 graduate, contestant on Top Chef, Season 3
 Dorian Boose, 1992 graduate, 1998-2001 NFL Defensive End
 Nick Edwards, 2008 graduate, professional rugby player
 Brent Goulet, 1983 graduate, professional soccer player, 1988 US Olympic Soccer Team
 Jo Koy, 1989 graduate, stand-up comic, often a panelist on E!'s late night show Chelsea Lately.
 Eduardo Peñalver, 1990 graduate, former Dean of Cornell Law School, now President of Seattle University
 Jimmy Shin, graduate, actor, director who has been mixing his musical and comedic talents all of his life. 
 Jessie Jones, graduate, Washington State CBS news television personality.

References

External links

Educational institutions established in 1973
High schools in Pierce County, Washington
Schools in Tacoma, Washington
Public high schools in Washington (state)
1973 establishments in Washington (state)
International Baccalaureate schools in Washington (state)